Excentradenia is a genus of plants in the family Malpighiaceae. Excentradenia comprises four species of woody vines native to the forests of northern South America.

External links and reference
Malpighiaceae Malpighiaceae - description, taxonomy, phylogeny, and nomenclature
Excentradenia
Anderson, W. R. 1997. Excentradenia, a new genus of Malpighiaceae from South America. Contr. Univ. Michigan Herb. 21: 29–36.

Malpighiaceae
Malpighiaceae genera